The 2005 South Florida Bulls football team represented the University of South Florida (USF) in the 2005 NCAA Division I-A football season.  South Florida was led by head coach Jim Leavitt played home games at Raymond James Stadium in Tampa, Florida.  The 2005 college football season was only the 9th season overall for the Bulls, and their first season in the Big East Conference.

Schedule

References

South Florida
South Florida Bulls football seasons
South Florida Bulls football